Hiroki Yamada may refer to:

 Hiroki Yamada (ski jumper) (born 1982), Japanese ski jumper
 Hiroki Yamada (footballer) (born 1988), Japanese footballer
 Hiroki Yamada (baseball) (born 1988), Japanese baseball pitcher
 Hiroki Yamada (composer) (born 1967), Japanese composer